Sir John Pauncefoot (1368 – c. 1445) was the member of the English Parliament for the constituency of Gloucestershire for the parliaments of May 1413 and December 1421.

References 

Members of the Parliament of England for Gloucestershire
English MPs May 1413
English knights
1368 births
1440s deaths
Year of death uncertain
English MPs December 1421